Vosmaeropsis complanatispinifera is a species of calcareous sponge in the family Heteropiidae, and was first described in 2015 by Cavalcanti, Bastos & Lanna. It is found off the Brazilian coast.

References

Calcarea
Animals described in 2015